The 1898–99 Bucknell Bison men's basketball team represented Bucknell University during the 1898–99 college men's basketball season. The team finished with an overall record of 3–5.

Schedule

|-

References

Bucknell Bison men's basketball seasons
Bucknell Bison men's basketball
Bucknell
Bucknell Bison men's basketball